The Sydney Derby, also known as The Battle of the Bridge is an Australian rules football local derby match between the two Sydney based Australian Football League (AFL) clubs, the Sydney Swans and the Greater Western Sydney Giants. As of Round 1 of the 2022 season, the head-to-head is in favour of the Sydney Swans by 14 wins to 9; the teams have also met three times in finals matches, with Greater Western Sydney winning each time.

History

The first Sydney Derby was held on 24 March 2012 and attracted a then-Derby record crowd of 38,203. This game was also the first game of the 2012 AFL season and the first AFL premiership match for the Giants. Fielding a very young and inexperienced team, the Giants only won three games in their first two years in the competition and failed to win any Derby games. This led to declining attendances at Sydney Derbies.

The Giants won their first Derby in the opening clash of 2014. Later in the year The Daily Telegraph noted there was 'genuine dislike off the field' between the clubs. Over the subsequent years, the Giants progressively moved up the AFL ladder and got closer to the Swans, who were premiership contenders during this time. The opening Derby of 2015 attracted a crowd of over 30,000—the first time this had occurred since the first Derby. The 2016 Derbies were both well attended—the Swans home game had the second highest attendance in fixture history. The Giants home game was the 10th Sydney Derby. With both teams vying for a top four spot at the end of the season, the game was described as a blockbuster. In the lead up to the game The Daily Telegraph published an article analysing the rivalry. Though noting that Sydney's surprise recruitment of Lance Franklin created some animosity between the clubs, the article went on to say 'What the rivalry needs is a flash point. ... Something to make it clear that when the Swans and Giants meet there is real feeling. Not the slightly awkward yet mutually respectful détente that currently exists'.  After the game, the paper declared that an altercation between Steve Johnson and Lance Franklin 'was the moment of sporting theatre that inspired a rivalry to truly ignite'. It was the first AFL game at Sydney Showground Stadium to be declared a sell-out and was Foxtel's highest rating program of the day, second highest rating twilight match of the season and the second-most watched Sydney Derby - behind only the inaugural clash.

The first finals series match between the teams was on 10 September 2016, when the Swans hosted the Giants in the 1st Qualifying Final of the 2016 season. The Giants defeated the Swans by 36 points, an historic victory considering it was the Giants' first win in a finals series match and was played before a derby record crowd of 60,222. The two teams met again in a finals match in the 2018 second elimination final; it was the first time the sides met in a knock-out match. The Giants registered their biggest-ever victory over the Swans, winning by 49 points in front of a crowd of 40,350—the largest for a Sydney Derby at the Sydney Cricket Ground.

In August 2020, the two teams contested a Sydney Derby at Optus Stadium in Perth due to concerns over a second wave of coronavirus cases in Sydney, while Sydney's outbreak in July 2021 saw that month's fixture moved first to Mars Stadium in Ballarat, then to Metricon Stadium following a COVID-19 outbreak in Victoria.

The two teams met in a Sydney Derby final for the third time in 2021, with that match taking place at University of Tasmania Stadium in Launceston, Tasmania. It became the fourth different state to host a Sydney Derby. In front of a crowd of 8,635, the smallest ever Sydney Derby finals crowd and the third-smallest Sydney Derby crowd overall, the Giants defeated the Swans by 1 point, the narrowest winning margin in the derby's history.

Venues 
The two venues usually used for the Sydney Derby are the Sydney Cricket Ground and Sydney Showground Stadium. The first three Sydney Derbies and the 2016 finals series derby were held at Stadium Australia. During the COVID-19 pandemic, Sydney Derby XIX was played at Optus Stadium in Perth, Sydney Derby XXI was played at Metricon Stadium on the Gold Coast and Sydney Derby XXII was played at University of Tasmania Stadium in Launceston. This meant that three of the last four Sydney Derbies took place on neutral territory.

Results 

|- style="background:#ccf;font-size: 110%"
| 
| Year
| Date
| 
| Home Team
| 
| Away Team
| 
| Ground
| width="45" | Crowd
| Result/Winner
|
||
|- style="background:#fff;font-size: 100%;"
|I
| rowspan="2" style="text-align: center;" |2012
|24/03
|1
|  G. W. Sydney
|5.7 (37)
| style="background:#ccffcc;" | Sydney
| style="background:#ccffcc;" |14.16 (100)
|Stadium Australia
| bgcolor="#FFFFA6" |38,203
| bgcolor="red" style="text-align: center;" div |
| 63
| bgcolor="red" style="text-align: center;" div |
|- style="background:#fff;font-size: 100%;"
|II
|30/06
|14
| style="background:#ccffcc;" | Sydney
| style="background:#ccffcc;" |19.18 (132)
|  G. W. Sydney
|5.8 (38)
|Stadium Australia
|22,565
| bgcolor="red" style="text-align: center;" div |
| 94
| bgcolor="red" style="text-align: center;" div |
|- style="background:#fff;font-size: 100%;"
|III
| rowspan="2" style="text-align: center;" |2013
|30/03
|1
|  G. W. Sydney
|11.10 (76)
| style="background:#ccffcc;" | Sydney
| style="background:#ccffcc;" |16.10 (106)
|Stadium Australia
|23,690
| bgcolor="red" style="text-align: center;" div |
| 30
| bgcolor="red" style="text-align: center;" div |
|- style="background:#fff;font-size: 100%;"
|IV
|14/07
|16
| style="background:#ccffcc;" | Sydney
| style="background:#ccffcc;" |24.27 (171)
|  G. W. Sydney
|5.12 (42)
|SCG
|21,757
| bgcolor="red" style="text-align: center;" div |
| 129
| bgcolor="red" style="text-align: center;" div |
|- style="background:#fff;font-size: 100%;"
|V
| rowspan="2" style="text-align: center;" |2014
|15/03
|1
| style="background:#ccffcc;" | G. W. Sydney
| style="background:#ccffcc;" |15.9 (99)
| Sydney
|9.13 (67)
|Syd. Showground
| 17,102
| bgcolor="#444444" style="text-align: center;" div |
| 32
| bgcolor="Red" style="text-align: center;" div |
|- style="background:#fff;font-size: 100%;"
|VI
|28/06
|15
| style="background:#ccffcc;" | Sydney
| style="background:#ccffcc;" |15.16 (106)
| G. W. Sydney
|8.12 (60)
|SCG
| 27,778
| bgcolor="red" style="text-align: center;" div |
| 46
| bgcolor="Red" style="text-align: center;" div |
|- style="background:#fff;font-size: 100%;"
|VII
| rowspan="2" style="text-align: center;" |2015
|18/04
|3
| style="background:#ccffcc;" | Sydney
| style="background:#ccffcc;" |16.15 (111)
|  G. W. Sydney
|12.18 (90)
|SCG
| bgcolor="#FFFFA6" |31,966
| bgcolor="Red" style="text-align: center;" div |
| 21
| bgcolor="Red" style="text-align: center;" div |
|- style="background:#fff;font-size: 100%;"
|VIII
|22/08
|21
| G. W. Sydney
|6.8 (44)
| style="background:#ccffcc;" | Sydney
| style="background:#ccffcc;" |20.13 (133)
|Syd. Showground
| 19,507
| bgcolor="Red" style="text-align: center;" div |
| 89
| bgcolor="Red" style="text-align: center;" div |
|- style="background:#fff;font-size: 100%;"
|IX
| rowspan="3" style="text-align: center;" |2016
|09/04
|3
| style="background:#ccffcc;" | Sydney
| style="background:#ccffcc;" |14.9 (93)
| G. W. Sydney
|10.8 (68)
|SCG
| bgcolor="#FFFFA6" |37,045
| bgcolor="Red" style="text-align: center;" div |
| 25
| bgcolor="Red" style="text-align: center;" div |
|- style="background:#fff;font-size: 100%;"
|X
|12/06
|12
| style="background:#ccffcc;" | G. W. Sydney
| style="background:#ccffcc;" |15.15 (105)
| Sydney
| 9.9 (63)
|Syd. Showground
| 21,541
| bgcolor="#444444" style="text-align: center;" div |
| 42
| bgcolor="Red" style="text-align: center;" div |
|- style="background:#fff;font-size: 100%;"
|XI
|10/09
|bgcolor="gold"| 
| Sydney
| 7.13 (55)
| style="background:#ccffcc;" | G. W. Sydney
| style="background:#ccffcc;" |12.19 (91)
|Stadium Australia
| bgcolor="gold" |60,222
| bgcolor="#444444" style="text-align: center;" div |
| 36
| bgcolor="Red" style="text-align: center;" div |
|-style="background:#fff;font-size: 100%;"
| XII
| rowspan="2" style="text-align: center;" |2017
|22/04
|5
| Sydney
| 9.9 (63)
|style="background:#ccffcc;" |  G. W. Sydney
|style="background:#ccffcc;" | 15.15 (105)
|SCG
| bgcolor="#FFFFA6" | 34,824
| bgcolor="#444444" style="text-align: center;" div |
| 42
| bgcolor="Red" style="text-align: center;" div |
|- style="background:#fff;font-size: 100%;"
| XIII
|15/07
|17
| G. W. Sydney
| 12.11 (83)
|style="background:#ccffcc;" |  Sydney
|style="background:#ccffcc;" | 14.12 (96)
|Syd. Showground
| 21,924
| bgcolor="Red" style="text-align: center;" div |
| 13
| bgcolor="Red" style="text-align: center;" div |
|-style="background:#fff;font-size: 100%;"
| XIV
| rowspan="3" style="text-align: center;" |2018
|07/04
|3
|style="background:#ccffcc;" |  Sydney
|style="background:#ccffcc;" | 16.7 (103)
| G. W. Sydney
|12.15 (87)
|SCG
| bgcolor="#FFFFA6" |34,711
| bgcolor="Red" style="text-align: center;" div |
| 16
| bgcolor="Red" style="text-align: center;" div |
|- style="background:#fff;font-size: 100%;"
| XV
|18/08
|22
| G. W. Sydney
|8.12 (60)
|style="background:#ccffcc;" |  Sydney
|style="background:#ccffcc;" | 11.14 (80)
|Syd. Showground
| 21,433
| bgcolor="Red" style="text-align: center;" div |
| 20 
| bgcolor="Red" style="text-align: center;" div |
|- style="background:#fff;font-size: 100%;"
| XVI
|08/09
|bgcolor="gold"| 
| Sydney
|4.6 (30)
|style="background:#ccffcc;" | G. W. Sydney
|style="background:#ccffcc;" |10.19 (79)
|SCG
|bgcolor="#FFFFA6" |40,350
| bgcolor="#444444" style="text-align: center;" div |
| 49
| bgcolor="Red" style="text-align: center;" div |
|-style="background:#fff;font-size: 100%;"
| XVII
| rowspan="2" style="text-align: center;" |2019
|27/04
|6
| Sydney
| 12.7 (79)
|style="background:#ccffcc;" | G. W. Sydney
|style="background:#ccffcc;" |18.12 (120)
|SCG
| 29,780
| bgcolor="#444444" style="text-align: center;" div |
| 41
| bgcolor="Red" style="text-align: center;" div |
|- style="background:#fff;font-size: 100%;"
| XVIII
|03/08
|20
|style="background:#ccffcc;" | G. W. Sydney
|style="background:#ccffcc;" |12.11 (83)
| Sydney
| 12.9 (81)
|Syd. Showground
| 16,116
| bgcolor="#444444" style="text-align: center;" div |
| 2
| bgcolor="Red" style="text-align: center;" div |
|- style="background:#fff;font-size: 100%;"
| XIX
| style="text-align: center;" |2020
|13/08
|12
|style="background:#ccffcc;" |  Sydney
|style="background:#ccffcc;" | 10.6 (66)
| G. W. Sydney
| 3.7 (25)
|Perth Stadium
|6,464
| bgcolor="Red" style="text-align: center;" div |
| 41 
| bgcolor="Red" style="text-align: center;" div |
|- style="background:#fff;font-size: 100%;"
| XX
| rowspan="3" style="text-align: center;" |2021
|17/04
|5
| Sydney
| 10.9 (69)
|style="background:#ccffcc;" | G. W. Sydney
|style="background:#ccffcc;" | 9.17 (71)
|SCG
|33,541
| bgcolor="#444444" style="text-align: center;" div |
| 2 
| bgcolor="Red" style="text-align: center;" div |
|- style="background:#fff;font-size: 100%;"
| XXI
|18/07
|18
| G. W. Sydney
| 11.6 (72)
|style="background:#ccffcc;" |  Sydney
|style="background:#ccffcc;" | 15.8 (98)
|Carrara Stadium
|2,374
|  bgcolor= "Red" style="text-align: center;" div |
| 26 
| bgcolor="Red" style="text-align: center;" div  |
|- style="background:#fff;font-size: 100%;"
| XXII
|28/08
|bgcolor="gold"| 
| Sydney
| 10.13 (73)
|style="background:#ccffcc;" | G. W. Sydney
|style="background:#ccffcc;" | 11.8 (74)
|York Park
|8,635
| bgcolor="#444444" style="text-align: center;" div |
| 1 
| bgcolor="Red" style="text-align: center;" div | 
|- style="background:#fff;font-size: 100%;"
| XXIII
| rowspan="2" style="text-align: center;" |2022
|19/03
|1
| G. W. Sydney
| 13.14 (92)
|style="background:#ccffcc;" | Sydney
|style="background:#ccffcc;" | 17.10 (112)
|Stadium Australia
|25,572
| bgcolor= "Red" style="text-align: center;" div |
| 20 
| bgcolor="Red" style="text-align: center;" div  |
|- style="background:#fff;font-size: 100%;"
| XXIV
|30/07
|20
|style="background:#ccffcc;" | Sydney
|style="background:#ccffcc;" | 17.10 (112)
| G. W. Sydney
| 5.9 (39)
|SCG
| 31,916
| bgcolor= "Red" style="text-align: center;" div |
| 73 
| bgcolor="Red" style="text-align: center;" div  |

Source: Click here

Timeline

Brett Kirk Medal 

The Brett Kirk Medal is awarded to the player deemed to be the best player on the ground after the match. It is named after Sydney Swans AFL premiership player Brett Kirk, who was born and raised in country New South Wales and played junior football for North Albury.

NOTE: No medal was awarded in Sydney Derby XI, Sydney Derby XVI or Sydney Derby XXII due to those matches being finals matches.

Statistics 
Below are listed statistics from the Battle of the Bridge only.

Team statistics

Highest scores

Lowest scores

Biggest wins

Smallest wins

Player statistics 
Players highlighted in green are still on AFL lists for either Sydney or Greater Western Sydney.

Goals in one game

Goal total

Disposals in one game

Derbies played

Brownlow votes 

Brownlow Votes as of the end of the 2018 AFL season.

Coach statistics 
Coaches highlighted in green are the current head coach for either Sydney or Greater Western Sydney.

Other Sydney Derbies

AFL Pre-Season results 
Like both the "Western Derby" and the "Showdown", pre-season matches do not count towards the overall Sydney Derby results and statistics. However, The first ever match between the Greater Western Sydney Giants and the Sydney Swans occurred during the 2011 pre-season. To date three of the six fixtures have been held in either suburban or regional venues, as part of the restructured pre-season competition to see more matches being held in more non-traditional venues.

AFL Women's

See also 

 Western Derby: The AFL Intrastate Derby of Western Australia, first played in 1995. (West Coast Eagles Vs. Fremantle Dockers).
 Showdown: The AFL Intrastate Derby of South Australia, first played in 1997. (Adelaide Crows Vs. Port Adelaide Power).
 QClash: The AFL intrastate Derby of Queensland, first played in 2011. (Brisbane Lions Vs. Gold Coast Suns)

Notes

References 

Australian Football League games
Australian Football League rivalries
Sydney Swans
Greater Western Sydney Giants
Sports competitions in Sydney
Australian rules football in New South Wales